Derounian is a surname. Notable people with the surname include: 

Arthur Derounian (1909–1991), Armenian-American journalist and writer
Steven Derounian (1918–2007), American politician